Shahar Lev-Ari is an Israeli public health scholar. He is a member and former Chair of the Department of Health Promotion at the School of Public Health, Sackler Faculty of Medicine at Tel Aviv University. He is a visiting scholar at Michael P. Snyder's Lab in the Department of Genetics at Stanford University.

Career 
Lev-Ari was trained in cellular biology and has expertise in biology and health promotion. He has been an academic board member of the Israeli Healthy Cities Initiative, treasurer of the Israeli Organization for Health Promotion and Education, a participant in the National Council for Health Promotion, member of the Global Working Group on Mental Health Promotion, and Section Editor of Public Health at the Journal of Clinical Medicine.

Lev-Ari is the founder and former director of the Integrative Medicine Center & Laboratory of Medicinal Herbs and Cancer Research within the Institute of Oncology of Tel Aviv Sourasky Medical Center. He leads the Health Promotion research and consultation at the Integrated Cancer Prevention Center. He received the Outstanding Scientist Award from the Israeli Society for Complementary Medicine under the auspices of the Israel Medical Association (2010).

Lev-Ari's lab has developed and assessed the mechanisms and effectiveness of the Inquiry Based Stress Reduction (IBSR) intervention on well-being: from promotion to prevention, treatment, and recovery. He has co-authored over 75 peer-reviewed papers and book chapters - among them 15 studies assessing the effect of IBSR on physical and mental health among healthy individuals, teachers, adults who stutter, cancer patients and survivors, and women carrying a mutation in the BRCA gene.

Lev-Ari has been a student, practitioner, and teacher of mindfulness practices and inquiry (the work of Byron Katie) in Israel and around the world for many years.

References 

1969 births
Living people